The Sunland Park Oaks (formerly the WinStar Oaks) is an American Thoroughbred horse race open to three-year-old fillies and mares willing to race one and one-sixteenth miles on the dirt.  The Oaks, an ungraded stakes event, is held in March at Sunland Park Racetrack & Casino (founded in 1959) in New Mexico.

Once sponsored by WinStar Farm in Kentucky where Distorted Humor and Tiznow stand, the race offers a purse of $200,000.  Begun as a one and one sixteenth mile race, then taken down to a mile, it is now back to one and one-sixteenth.

Since 2013, the Oaks has been part of the Road to the Kentucky Oaks, a series of races through which fillies qualify for the Kentucky Oaks.

The race was not run in 2016 due to an outbreak of equine herpesvirus.

National Museum of Racing and Hall of Fame jockey Jerry Bailey and Mike E. Smith, as well as jockeys Patrick Valenzuela and Cash Asmussen, all began their careers at Sunland Park.

Records
Speed record:
 1:41.06 @ 1 1/16 miles: Midnight Lucky (2013) (new track record)

Most wins by a jockey:
 4 - Victor Espinoza (2006, 2007, 2009, 2015)

Most wins by a trainer:
 8 - Bob Baffert (2007, 2009, 2011, 2012, 2013, 2014, 2015, 2019)

Most wins by an owner:
 2 - Karl Watson, Paul Weitman (2007, 2013)
 2 - Peachtree Stable (2011, 2012)

Winners

See also
Road to the Kentucky Oaks

References

External links
Sunland Park

Ungraded stakes races in the United States
Horse races in New Mexico
Flat horse races for three-year-old fillies
Sunland Park Racetrack & Casino